Encounters is an album by American jazz pianist Mal Waldron and bassist David Friesen recorded in 1984 and released by the Muse label.

Reception
The Allmusic review by Ken Dryden awarded the album 4 stars stating "Longtime fans of Mal Waldron will find his duo session with bassist David Friesen to be of a very different character. The pianist's solo and trio recordings are typically intense, very moody performances, but his touch is much lighter".

Track listing 
 "If I Were A Bell" (Frank Loesser)
 "Encounters" (Mal Waldron, David Friesen)
 "My Toby" (Friesen)
 "Night Wind" (Waldron, Friesen)
 "Imagination" (Jimmy Van Heusen, Johnny Burke)
 "Outside Inside Too" (Waldron)
Recorded in New York City on March 18, 1984

Personnel 
 Mal Waldron — piano (tracks 1, 2 & 4-6)
 David Friesen — bass (tracks 1-3 & 5), shakuhachi (track 4)

References 

Muse Records albums
Mal Waldron albums
David Friesen albums
1985 albums